The 2010 Africa Trophy, was the seventh edition of second level rugby union tournament in Africa and the second one under this name. The competition are divided into three zones (North, center and South).

North Zone 

The tournament was played in Niamey, Niger.

First round

5–8 Classification

Semifinals

Finals

Playoff 3rd–4th

Playoff 5th–6th

Playoff 7th–8th

Center Zone 

The tournament was played in Kigali, Rwanda.

South Zone 

The tournament was played in Arusha, Tanzania.

Semifinals

Third place match

Final

See also
2010 Africa Cup
2010 CAR Development Trophy

External links
2010 International Rugby Fixtures and Results - rugbyinternational.net

Africa Cup
Africa Trophy
Trophy
Africa Trophy
Africa Trophy
Africa Trophy